Sir James Somerville (1882–1949) was a British admiral.

James Somerville may also refer to:
James Somerville, 6th Lord Somerville (died 1569), Lord of the Parliament of Scotland
James Somerville (family historian) (1632–1690), Scottish writer and soldier
Sir James Somerville, 1st Baronet (1698–1748), Irish politician
James Somerville (Bruce County politician) (1826–1898)
James Somerville (Wentworth County, Ontario politician) (1834–1916)
James Somerville, 2nd Baron Athlumney (1865–1929), Irish noble
James Dugald Somerville (1868–1960), South Australian historian
James Graham Somerville (1915–2014), conservationist
Jimmy Somerville (born 1961), Scottish singer-songwriter
Jimmy Somerville (footballer) ( 1920s), Scottish footballer with Airdrieonians

See also
 James Sommerville, Canadian-born horn player